Julianne Kirchner (born December 19, 1991) is an American and Marshallese swimmer, who specialized in sprint freestyle events. Having moved with her family to the Marshall Islands at a very young age because of her father's occupation, Kirchner acquired a dual citizenship to participate internationally for her new homeland in swimming at the 2008 Summer Olympics.

Kirchner was one of the five athletes to mark an Olympic debut for the Marshall Islands at the 2008 Summer Olympics in Beijing, competing in the women's 50 m freestyle. She established a personal best of 30.42 to take the fourth spot and seventy-fifth overall in heat three of the morning prelims, failing to advance to the top 16 semifinals.

Kirchner is currently a member of Kwajalein Swim Team in the Marshall Islands under the tutelage of her personal coach Sarah Stepchew.

References

External links
 
NBC Olympics Profile

1991 births
Living people
Sportspeople from Florence, Alabama
Marshallese female swimmers
American female swimmers
Olympic swimmers of the Marshall Islands
Swimmers at the 2008 Summer Olympics
Marshallese female freestyle swimmers
American female freestyle swimmers
Marshallese people of American descent
American expatriates in the Marshall Islands
21st-century American women